Colin Bass (born 4 May 1951) is an English musician, singer, songwriter and record producer. Since 1979, he has been a member of the British progressive rock band Camel, who, after a ten-year hiatus due to the ill health of bandleader Andrew Latimer, returned to active touring in 2013. From 1984 to 1992, he was also a core figure in the pioneering World Music group 3 Mustaphas 3. He has also made two solo albums under his own name and three albums recorded in Indonesia under the name Sabah Habas Mustapha. The title track of the first, "Denpasar Moon", became a hugely popular song in Indonesia in the mid-1990s and has been covered by over 50 Indonesian, Malaysian, Japanese and Filipino artists. As a record producer he has worked with a diverse range of international artists including: the Klezmatics (USA), SambaSunda (Indonesia), Daniel Kahn & the Painted Bird (USA) Krar Collective (Ethiopia), Etran Finatawa (Niger) and 9Bach (Wales) amongst others. As a guest artist he has appeared on albums by a number of internationally acclaimed artists including top Malian singing star Oumou Sangare, playing on all tracks of her 1993 Ko Sira album.

Biography

Early life and career
Bass was born in London and first started playing professionally in 1968 as guitarist with a band called the Krisis, playing the UK club and ballroom circuit, after which he switched to bass guitar and joined Velvet Opera in 1970 with whom he made his first recordings for Spark Records.

1970s
In 1971, he joined an incarnation of the 1960s group the Foundations and spent a year playing the cabaret clubs mostly in northern England.

In 1971, he met Ernie Graham, formerly of Eire Apparent and, together with guitarist Jonathan Glemser, they formed the band Clancy. The band became part of London's growing Pub-Rock scene and briefly signed with Island Records but were dropped after differences with producer Muff Winwood.

Shortly afterwards, the band signed with Warner Brothers and recorded two albums: Seriously Speaking (1974) and Every Day (1975). The line-up on both was: Bass (bass, vocals), Ernie Graham (guitar, vocals), Gasper Lawal (percussion), Dave Vasco (guitar), Dave Skinner (keyboards, vocals) and Barry Ford (drums, vocals).

Clancy split in 1976 and Bass joined Steve Hillage, who was putting together a band to promote the album L on a six-month tour of Europe and the USA. The line-up included ex-Jethro Tull drummer Clive Bunker.

In 1977, Bass was invited by American saxophonist and composer Jim Cuomo, who had occasionally played with Clancy, to participate in his musical Woe Babylon at the Edinburgh Festival. The band from the show included pianist Ollie Marland and drummer Miguel Olivares and this quartet became a project known as the Casual Band. Olivares was later replaced by ex-Back Door drummer Tony Hicks. 
Recordings were made with producer Tom Newman but were never released.

In 1979, Steve Hillage tour manager Laurie Small introduced Bass to British progressive-rock band Camel.
The line-up at the time was Andrew Latimer (guitar, vocals), Andy Ward (drums) and keyboardists Kit Watkins (ex-Happy The Man) and Jan Schelhaas (ex-Caravan). There followed two albums I Can See Your House From Here (1979) and Nude (1980) and respective international tours.

1980s
In 1981 at the end of the "Nude" tour, Andy Ward's health problems led to Andrew Latimer's dissolving of the band. Bass relocated to Paris where he recorded an album and performed live with old colleague Jim Cuomo.

Returning to the UK in 1983 he took up a teaching post, played sessions and club and pub gigs with various line-ups until Andrew Latimer invited him to rejoin Camel for the 1984 "Stationary Traveller" tour. In the same year he started to play with the Anglo-Ghanaian band Orchestra Jazira, which led to his induction in the pioneer world-music group 3 Mustaphas 3, who renamed him as Sabah Habas Mustapha.

Between 1985 and 1991, the 3 Mustaphas 3 recorded four full albums and sundry singles and EPs and established a cult following for their live performances, touring in the USA, Europe, Japan and also in the then Eastern Bloc countries of East Germany, Hungary and Bulgaria.

1990s
When the 3 Mustaphas 3 stopped activities in 1991, Bass went to Indonesia where, over the next ten years, he recorded three solo albums with Indonesian musicians under the name of Sabah Habas Mustapha. 
The first, Denpasar Moon (1994), was recorded in Jakarta and explored the sounds of the popular music style dangdut.

The title song, "Denpasar Moon", first released in 1993, became a major hit in Indonesia in the form of a cover version by a singer from the Philippines called Maribeth and was subsequently recorded by over 50 different Indonesian artists and also artists from Malaysia and Japan.

In 1997, Bass founded the Kartini Music record label whose first release was another Sabah Habas Mustapha record, Jalan Kopo, recorded in Bandung, Indonesia, and this time influenced by the sounds of the west Javanese province of Sunda. The title cut from that record is played as pre-show music for the nighttime fireworks/water spectacular IllumiNations: Reflections of Earth at Epcot, located in Walt Disney World in Orlando, Florida.

At the same time, the 1990s saw a rejuvenated Camel back on the scene after a long period of inactivity due to a protracted legal dispute with previous management.

In 1991, Andrew Latimer, now relocated to California, invited Colin to participate in the recording of "Dust and Dreams", the first release by his own label Camel Productions, which was followed by a world tour in 1992 with the line-up of Latimer, Bass and Mickey Simmonds (keyboards) and Paul Burgess (drums).

Between then and 2003, Camel released another three studio albums and undertook subsequent tours all documented with live albums and DVDs.

In 1998, Kartini Music released Bass' first album under the name Colin Bass: An Outcast of the Islands. Recorded in Poland and California and featuring Andrew Latimer on guitar, the then Camel drummer Dave Stewart and a number of Polish musicians, the album gathered critical praise and helped establish his reputation in Poland. 
Subsequent tours produced two live albums: Live at Polskie Radio 3 (1999) and Live Vol.2: Acoustic Songs (2000).

2000s
2000 also saw the release of another Sabah Habas Mustapha album recorded in Bandung: So La Li.
It further explored the sounds of the Sundanese region and featured again the multi-instrumentalist Ismet Ruchimat and several musicians from his group SambaSunda. So La Li won wide critical acclaim and was nominated for a BBC Radio 3 World Music Award.

Bass lived in Berlin, Germany from 1988–2011. From 1994 until the end of 2008, he wrote and presented a weekly radio show for RBB Radio Multikulti and WDR Funkhaus Europa in Germany: "Sabah am Sonntag", presenting musical rarities and curiosities from around the world.

2010s
In 2012, Bass moved to North Wales, and set up Wild End Studio.

In 2013, he travelled to Niger to produce an album for Etran Finatawa, recorded in a tent in the Sahara desert. That same year Camel returned to the stage with a European tour and a live DVD recorded at their concert at the London Barbican.

In 2014, Bass co-produced the album Tincian by Welsh band 9Bach with post-production and mixing completed at Wild End Studios. Camel embarked on part 2 of the 'Snow Goose' European Tour.

2015 saw another Camel European Tour and 9Bach winning the 'Best Album' category at the BBC Radio 2 Folk Awards for Tincian.

Discography

Solo
 1998: An Outcast of the Islands
 1998: As Far as I Can See EP
 1999: Denpasar Moon EP
 1999: Live at Polskie Radio 3 2 CD
 1999: Poznań Pie – Live in Concert VHS
 2000: Live Vol. 2 – Acoustic Songs
 2002: Gently Kindly
 2003: In the Meantime
 2003: An Outcast of the Islands – Remastered + 3 bonus tracks
 2005: Planetarium – With Józef Skrzek
 2006: In the Meantime – Remastered + 5 bonus tracks
 2012: An Outcast of the Islands - Reissue
 2015: At Wild End

Albums by other artists produced by Colin Bass
 1989: Chisi by Stella Chiweshe (Piranha)
 2005: Rahwana's Cry by SambaSunda (Network Medien)
 2010: Tarkat Tajje / Let's Go! by Etran Finatawa (Riverboat/WMN)
 2010: Lost Causes by Daniel Kahn & the Painted Bird (Oriente)
 2011: Java by SambaSunda Quintet (Riverboat/WMN)
 2012: Ethiopia Super Krar by Krar Collective (Riverboat/WMN)
 2012: Go Calypsonian by Lord Mouse and the Kalypso Katz (Piranha Music)
 2012: Anewala - Walking Man' by Alhousseini Anivolla (Riverboat/WMN)
 2013: The Sahara Sessions by Etran Finatawa (Riverboat/WMN)
 2014: Tincian by 9Bach (Real World Records)

As Sabah Habas Mustapha
 1994: Denpasar Moon 1998: Jalan Kopo 1999: So La Li 2004: Denpasar Moon 2004 – remastered + bonus

With Camel
 1979: I Can See Your House from Here 1981: Nude 1984: Pressure Points: Live in Concert (live, 11 May 1984, Hammersmith Odeon, London, UK)
 1991: Dust and Dreams 1993: Never Let Go (1993) (live, 5 September 1992, Enschede, Netherlands) 2 CD
 1996: Harbour of Tears 1997: On the Road 1981 (1997) (live, BBC radio, 2 April 1981, Hammersmith Odeon, London, UK)
 1998: Coming of Age (1998) (live, 13 March 1997, Billboard, Los Angeles, USA) – Live CD and DVD
 1999: Rajaz 2001: The Paris Collection (2001) (live, 30 September 2000, Bataclan-Club, Paris, France) Note: CD wrongly states concert as 30 October
 2002: A Nod and a Wink 2012: The Snow Goose (new re-recorded version)

With 3 Mustaphas 3
 1986: Orchestra BAM de Grand Mustapha International and (Jolly) Party – Local Music 1987: Shopping 1990: Soup of the Century 1991: Friends, Fiends & Fronds 2001: Play Musty for Me''

References

External links
 Colin Bass official website
 Colin Bass discography and album reviews, credits & releases at AllMusic
 Colin Bass solo album discography, releases & credits at Discogs.com
 Colin Bass credits on different albums at Discogs.com
 Colin Bass solo albums to be listened as stream at Spotify.com

1951 births
English bass guitarists
English male guitarists
Male bass guitarists
English record producers
Living people
Camel (band) members
English songwriters
English expatriates in Germany
British expatriates in Indonesia
English rock bass guitarists
English male singers
English rock guitarists
Elmer Gantry's Velvet Opera members
Musicians from London
Progressive rock bass guitarists